Cindy Cheung (Traditional Chinese: 張瑋恩), born 1984 is a TV presenter, most recently affiliated with Fairchild Television.

Biography

Cindy entered the New Talent Singing Awards Vancouver Audition 2001 and won first place.  She then represented Vancouver in the NTSA International Finals in Shanghai, China.  She did not place in the top three in the contest.

Upon return from the contest, she started to host live mall shows for Fairchild Television.  Finally in 2003, she was placed as a permanent host on the long-running program, What's On and has been with the show until November 2006.  Her other credits include hosting the NTSA Vancouver Finals from 2003 to 2006.

Cindy is a graduate at the University of British Columbia studying in economics.

She recently moved back to Hong Kong to pursue another career, ending her contract with Fairchild Television after five years.

Selected TV filmography
New Talent Singing Awards Vancouver Audition 新秀歌唱大賽溫哥華選拔賽 - Master of Ceremonies (2003–2006)
What's On 熒幕八爪娛 - Host ( 2003–2006 )

External links

Cindy Cheung Official Artist Profile For Fairchild TV (In Chinese)

1984 births
Living people
People from Vancouver
New Talent Singing Awards contestants
Canadian television hosts
Canadian women television hosts
Hong Kong emigrants to Canada
University of British Columbia alumni